Flavio Gioia or Gioja, also known as Ioannes Gira Amalphensis (1300 – ?) is reputed to have been an Italian mariner,  inventor, and supposedly a marine pilot. He has traditionally been credited with developing the sailor's compass, but this has been debated. However, he is credited with perfecting it by suspending its needle over a wind rose design with north designed by a fleur-de-lys, and enclosing it in a box with a glass cover. He was also said to have introduced such design, which pointed North, to defend against Charles of Anjou, the French king of Naples.

Although the surname "Gioia" is true, the name "Flavio" has been demonstrated to be a translation error. His real name was probably Giovanni; and his birthplace has been found to be Positano, in the Amalfi Coast. 

The lunar crater Gioja is named after him.

References 
 [https://web.archive.org/web/20071128001608/http://www.sapere.it/tca/MainApp?srvc=dcmnt&url=%2Ftc%2Fstoria%2Farticoli%2FDP%2FM%2FBussola%2FBussola.jsp Si trattò soltanto di un errore dovuto ad una virgola] (It was just a mistake caused by a comma) (found at sapere.it, stored at archive.org)

Gioia, Flavio
Gioia, Flavio
Gioia, Flavio
Gioia, Flavio
People from Amalfi